Crenicichla anthurus is a species of cichlid native to South America. It is found in the  Amazon River basin, in the Ucayali, Huallaga, Putumayo, Napo and Amazon River basins.

References

Kullander, S.O., 1986. Cichlid fishes of the Amazon River drainage of Peru. Department of Vertebrate Zoology, Research Division, Swedish Museum of Natural History, Stockholm, Sweden, 394 p. 

anthurus
Fish of the Amazon basin
Taxa named by Edward Drinker Cope
Fish described in 1872